Jacob Davis Babcock Stillman (1819–1888) was personal physician to Leland Stanford, the eighth governor of California.
He is credited with counseling Mrs. Stanford sufficiently so that after eighteen years of marriage, she bore a son, Leland Jr., in whose memory Stanford University was established by his father.' The nature of this miraculous counseling is not specified."

Stillman wrote the book The Horse in Motion (1881) for Stanford, a study of the different strides of horses, based on the photographs that Eadweard Muybridge) had produced for Stanford. Stanford wanted to breed and train fast horses, but didn't trust most of the theories and images of their fast movements. When Muybridge published the chronophotographic picture sequences in 1878 as cabinet cards entitled The Horse in Motion, the actual positions of the legs during the different phases of trot and gallop had surprised a public accustomed to unrealistic paintings of horses in motion. Muybridge sued Stanford because the publication lacked proper credits for his work and the many illustrations based on his pictures.

Biography

Born 1819 in Schenectady, New York Jacob Davis Babcock Stillman, better known as JDB, migrated to California in 1849 and made a name not only as a physian but also as an adventurist, writer and a pioneer in the medical field.

Following his graduation in botany and biology in 1843 from the Union University in Schenectady, the third in the United States at the time, JDB worked as a director in a boarding and later as a surgeon at the Bellevue Hospital Center. He was married to Caroline Maxson the same year. During his tenure at the hospital, he  set off at age thirty on a 194-day ship journey on the Pacific Ocean for San Francisco via Cape Horn. He narrates the adventure and hardships he faced during the long journey  he made along with a bunch of 97 gold hunters--the misery made worse by a ruthless captain of the ship--in his maiden book, “ Seeking the Golden Fleece.” His wanderlust did not stop there. Soon after he landed in San Francisco, he made another trip on a boat across the Sacramento River to the gold mines with his friend Mark Hopkins Jr. but was back shortly after he fell sick. His book An 1850 Voyage, San Francisco to Baltimore, By Sea and Land, recounts his another epic voyage.

After the death of his first wife, JDB remarried Mary Gavitt Wells of Westerly, Rhode Island, and continued his medical practice in New York. After retiring from his profession, JDB moved to Redlands, California, where he bought 200 acre land and started a vineyard. JDB died in Redlands at the age of 69.

References

Physicians from New York (state)
1819 births
1888 deaths
People from Schenectady, New York